Clara is the Price is a 1975 Spanish film directed by Vicente Aranda. It stars Amparo Muñoz, Máximo Valverde and Juan Luis Galiardo. It was shot in Cadaques, Empuriabrava (Girona), Delta del Ebro (Tarragona) and Barcelona.

Synopsis
In a city on Spain's Costa Brava, Clara Valverde, a beautiful young woman, lives with her husband Juan. They seem to have a perfect marriage. Juan is an architect and has planned a daring urbanistic project. In reality, the project is not viable. Clara, to keep her marriage and finances afloat, works as a porno actress in an underground film industry. In spite of her job and her marriage, Clara is still a virgin. Her marriage has never been consummated because her husband is impotent for which she blames herself. In her work she does not allow to be penetrated. One day she goes to a meeting with Kellerman, an American millionaire who seems to be interested in bringing Juan's project into fruition. However, Clara soon learns that what he really wants is to blackmail her. The owner of the house, Jorge, finds out Claras's real occupation and threatens to tell the truth to her husband if she does not have sex with the American.

Clara is brutally raped by Kellerman. She then finds out that not only her husband is not impotent as she had thought, he has had sex with other women including Clara's friend. Juan also has a homosexual relationship with Miguel, the director of the pornographic films. She finally realizes that she has been only a coin exchanged in the hands of the men around her. Armed with a gun, Clara takes revenge killing Kellerman, humiliating Jorge and Miguel shooting them too.

Cast
Amparo Muñoz as Clara Valverde
Máximo Valverde as Juan
Juan Luis Galiardo as Jorge
Alejandro Ulloa as Kellerman
Carmen de Lirio as Kellerman's wife
Mario Pardo as Miguel
Ivonne Sentís as Marta

Production 
The idea behind the film came from Pedro Carvajal who wrote the screenplay. From Madrid he went to Barcelona and persuaded director Vicente Aranda to take on the project. Aranda was initially reluctant, but accepted to direct the film after making substantial changes to the script. However this is the only film in Aranda's long career in which he did not sign the script.

For the leading role of Clara, Aranda cast Amparo Muñoz, who was then not yet eighteen and had recently been elected Miss Spain. She was not a trained actress and this was her first film.  Juan Luis Galiardo and Maximo Valverde, two popular heartthrobs of Spanish cinema during the 1970s, were chosen for the male leads playing against type, one as a homosexual and the other as an impotent husband. 

With a budget of 9 million pesetas, the film was shot in studios in Barcelona and exteriors in Cadaques, Empuriabrava (Girona) and Delta del Ebro (Tarragona). The original title of the film, Pornografia (pornography),  was banned by censors and was changed to  Clara es el precio (Clara is the price).

External links

Notes

References
Cánovás, Joaquín (ed.), Varios Autores: Miradas sobre el cine de Vicente Aranda, Murcia: Universidad de Murcia, 2000, 
Vera, Pascual: Vicente Aranda, Ediciones J.C, Madrid, 1989, 

1975 films
1970s Spanish-language films
1975 drama films
Films directed by Vicente Aranda
Films about pornography
Spanish drama films